is a Japanese football player. He plays for FC Gifu.

Career
Hirofumi Yamauchi joined J1 League club Cerezo Osaka in 2017.

Club statistics
Updated to 22 February 2018.

References

External links
Profile at Cerezo Osaka

1995 births
Living people
Waseda University alumni
Association football people from Saitama Prefecture
Japanese footballers
J1 League players
J2 League players
J3 League players
Cerezo Osaka players
Cerezo Osaka U-23 players
FC Machida Zelvia players
Montedio Yamagata players
FC Gifu players
Association football midfielders